The 2019 season was Bethlehem Steel FC's fourth season of competitive soccer in the USL Championship and third season competing in the second division of American soccer. Steel FC competed in the league's Eastern Conference.

Current roster

Transfers

In

Out

Loan in

Competitions

Preseason

USL Championship

Results summary

Standings

Match results
All times in Eastern Time.

U.S. Open Cup 

Due to their affiliation with a higher division professional club (Philadelphia Union), Steel FC was one of 13 teams expressly forbidden from entering the Cup competition.

Statistics

|-
|colspan="10"|Defenders:
|-

|-
|colspan="10"|Midfielders:
|-

|-
|colspan="10"|Forwards:
|-

|}
Players with names in italics were on loan from Philadelphia Union for individual matches with Bethlehem.
Players with names marked ‡ were academy call-ups from Philadelphia Union Academy for individual matches with Bethlehem.
Players with names marked * were on loan from another club for the whole of their season with Bethlehem.

Goalkeepers
As of 20 April 2019.

Honors

Team of the Week
 Week 1 Team of the Week: M Zach Zandi
 Week 2 Team of the Week Bench: G Carlos Miguel Coronel
 Week 5 Team of the Week: D Ben Ofeimu
 Week 6 Team of the Week: F Kacper Przybylko

References

Philadelphia Union II seasons
Bethlehem Steel FC
Bethlehem Steel FC
Bethlehem Steel FC